Old Man may refer to:

Basic meanings
 An elderly man
 A father (especially as the phrase "my old man" to mean "my father")
 A husband
 Commanding officer of a military unit
 Captain of a merchant ship or a warship
 Any male amateur radio operator
 The old man (Christianity)

People
 La Chapelle-aux-Saints 1 ("The Old Man"), an almost-complete male Neanderthal skeleton discovered in La Chapelle-aux-Saints, France
 Leon Trotsky (1879–1940), Bolshevik revolutionary nicknamed the "Old Man" by both supporters and adversaries
 Richard Benjamin Harrison (1941–2018), American businessman and reality television personality of the series Pawn Stars, nicknamed "The Old Man"
 Joseph Paruta (1929–1986), member of the Gambino crime family nicknamed "Old Man"
 Yitzhak Sadeh (1890–1952), Israeli military commander nicknamed "The Old Man"

Literature
The Old Man (Gorky play) (Старик), a 1915 play by Maxim Gorky
 The Old Man (Wallace play), a 1931 play by Edgar Wallace 
 "Old Man", a poem by Edward Thomas
 "Old Man", a narrative thread in William Faulkner's 1939 novel If I Forget Thee, Jerusalem
The Old Man (Perry novel), a 2017 novel by Thomas Perry
The Old Man (Trifonov novel) (Старик), a novel by Yuri Trifonov
 The Old Man and the Sea, a short novel by Ernest Hemingway

Film, television and stage
 Old Man (film), a 2022 American film
 The Old Man (1931 film), based on the Edgar Wallace play of the same name
 The Old Man (2012 film), a 2012 Kazakhstani film
 The Old Man (2019 film), a 2019 Estonian animated film
 "The Old Man" (Seinfeld), an episode of the television series Seinfeld 
 The Old Man (TV series), based on the Thomas Perry novel of the same name
 Old Man, a Primetime Emmy Award–winning television movie based on the "Old Man" narrative thread in William Faulkner's novel If I Forget Thee, Jerusalem
 Old Man (Playhouse 90), a 1958 American television play
 The Old Man, a character in the film A Christmas Story

Music
 Old Man Luedecke, a Canadian indie banjo band

Songs
 "Old Man" (song) by Neil Young
 "Old Man", a song by Love, from the album Forever Changes
 "Old Man", a song by Randy Newman from Sail Away, covered by Art Garfunkel, 1974
 "Old Man", a song by Clouds, 1970
 "Old Man", a song by the Collectors, 1967
 "Old Man", a song by Harrys Gym, 2011
 "Old Man", a song by John David, 1976
 "Old Man", a song by Lighthouse, 1972
 "The Old Man" a song by Irving Berlin, sung by Bing Crosby and Danny Kaye, 1954
 "The Old Man", a song by Colm C.T. Wilkinson, 1977
 "The Old Man", a song written by Phil Coulter and sung by John McDermott about a man remembering his father after he has died
 "The Old Man", a song by the Fureys and Davey Arthur, 1982
 "The Old Man", a song by Matt Lucas
 "This Old Man" a children's song

Geography
 Old Man of the Hills, a mountain in Montana
 Old Man of the Mountain, a geological formation in New Hampshire
 Old Man of Hoy, a sea stack in Scotland
 Old Man of Coniston, a mountain in the Lake District of England
 Old Man of the Lake, a hemlock tree stump floating in Crater Lake, Oregon

Other
 Old Man (The Legend of Zelda), a recurring character in The Legend of Zelda video game series
 old man (magazine), a journal of the Union of Swiss Short Wave Amateurs

See also
 Old Man of the Mountain (disambiguation)
 Old Man River (disambiguation)
 My Old Man (disambiguation)
 Oldman (disambiguation)